Chessex Manufacturing is an American company that sells dice, primarily for the role-playing game (RPG) and collectible card game (CCG) market. It also offers other accessories used in RPGs and CCGs. The company also has a Chessex Europe branch office.

Chessex was also a distributor and publisher of tabletop games—RPGs, CCG, miniature wargames, board games, and related merchandise—until October 1998 when they merged distribution with The Armory to form Alliance Game Distributors.

Games published
 Banemaster: The Adventure (1995) collectible card game.
 Skyrealms of Jorune (1984–1994) role-playing game.
Wiz-War (1993-2010) A board game originally self published by Tom Jolly starting in 1985, Chessex published the 4th through 7th editions of the game and a single expansion. While they continued to have rights to the game until 2010 the game was sold out and unavailable shortly after 2000.

References 

Toy companies of the United States
Companies based in Fort Wayne, Indiana